Swords Creek is an unincorporated community in Russell County, Virginia, United States. Swords Creek has a post office with ZIP code 24649. The community was founded by hunters Henry and Michael Sword, for whom the settlement was named.

References

Unincorporated communities in Russell County, Virginia
Unincorporated communities in Virginia
Coal towns in Virginia